Christopher Miles Marshak, known by his stage name Chris Miles, is an American rapper signed to T3 Music Group. He gained popularity when his rap audition for America's Got Talent went viral.

Discography

Studio albums
 Nothing Matters Anymore. (2020)

Mixtapes 
 I Am Me (2012)
 Growing Pains (2013)
 Birth of Cool (2014)
 happy (2019)
 p.s. im sorry (2019)
 before it’s over (2019)

EPs
 milestones (2016)
 have a nice day (with Lil Xan) (2022)

Singles

References

External links
Official website
Chris Miles Twitter
Chris Miles Facebook
Chris Miles Instagram
Chris Miles YouTube

American rappers
Rappers from New York (state)
Living people
1999 births
21st-century American rappers